St. Charles Elementary School can refer to:

Canada:
 St. Charles Elementary School - Montreal, Quebec - Lester B. Pearson School Board

United States:
 St. Charles School - San Carlos, California
 St. Charles Street Elementary School - Jeanerette, Louisiana - Iberia Parish School Board
 St. Charles Elementary School - Thibodeaux, Louisiana - Lafourche Parish School District
 St. Charles Elementary School - Saint Charles, Michigan - St. Charles Community Schools
 St. Charles Elementary School - Saint Charles, Minnesota - St. Charles Public Schools

See also
St Charles' Primary School, Scotland